The Ghost Falls In Love (Spanish: El fantasma se enamora) is a 1953 Mexican comedy film directed by Rafael Portillo and starring Gloria Marín, Abel Salazar and Ramón Gay.

Cast
 Gloria Marín 
 Abel Salazar
 Ramón Gay 
 Aurora Walker 
 Arturo Soto Rangel 
 Carlos Riquelme

References

Bibliography 
 María Luisa Amador. Cartelera cinematográfica, 1950-1959. UNAM, 1985.

External links 
 

1953 films
1953 comedy films
Mexican comedy films
1950s Spanish-language films
Films directed by Rafael Portillo
Mexican black-and-white films
1950s Mexican films